Approximately 15,000 people in Denmark belong to an autochthonous ethnic German minority traditionally referred to as hjemmetyskere meaning "domestic Germans" in Danish, and as Nordschleswiger in German. This minority of Germans hold Danish citizenship and self-identify as ethnic Germans. They generally speak German or Low German alongside South Jutlandic dialect of Danish as their home languages. Furthermore, there are also several thousand German immigrants residing in Denmark with no historical connection to this group.

History

In 1920, in the aftermath of World War I, two Schleswig Plebiscites were held in the northernmost part of the Prussian Province of Schleswig-Holstein (the northern half of the former Duchy of Schleswig). The plebiscites were held in two zones that were defined by Denmark according to the ideas of the Danish historian Hans Victor Clausen. The northern Zone I was deliminated according to Clausen's estimation of where the local rural population identified itself as Danish, a survey published in 1891. Clausen travelled extensively on both sides of the eventual border, in an attempt determine which communities that would vote for a return to Danish rule, and concluded that this was the case north of the Skelbækken creek, where most rural communities were both Danish-speaking and pro-Danish, while the communities south of this line were overwhelmingly pro-German (though some of these communities were also primarily Danish-speaking). Near Tønder, he deviated from this system, and included the German-majority towns of Tønder and Højer into the northern sector for economic purposes, and to achieve a line following a dyke, consequently this line followed the dyke south of Højer.

The northern Zone I voted en bloc, i.e. as a unit with the majority deciding, and the result was 75% for Denmark and 25% for Germany, consequently resulting in a German minority north of the new border. In the southern Zone II, each parish/town voted for its own future allegiance, and all districts in Zone II showed German majorities. The eventual border was deliminated virtually identical with the border between Zones I and II.

In the northern Zone (Zone I), 25% of the population, i.e. around 40,000 people voted to remain part of Germany, the German North Schleswigers having their centres in the towns of Tønder, Aabenraa, and Sønderborg, but also in a rural district between Tønder and Flensburg near the new border, most notably in Tinglev. Smaller German minorities existed in Haderslev and Christiansfeld (both towns with Danish majorities). Sønderborg and Aabenraa were strongly dominated by both nationalities (c. 55% Germans and 45% Danes). In Sønderborg, the German majority was partially due to a local military garrison, and the German element in this town decreased sharply in the 1920s, after the German garrison had been withdrawn and replaced with a Danish one. Tønder had a vast German majority (c. 80%) but was included in the northern Zone for geographical and economic reasons, and because of the small population of this (and the other) North Schleswig towns.

Between 1920–1939, the North Schleswig Germans elected Johannes Schmidt-Vodder as their representative in the Danish Parliament with c. 13–15% of the North Schleswig votes, indicating that the share of North Schleswigers that identified as Germans had decreased when compared with the 1920 referendum.

Since 1945, the North Schleswig Germans have been presented by Bund Deutscher Nordschleswiger, a cultural organisation, and continued to elect a member of Parliament until the 1950s.

The North Schleswig Germans are currently represented in the municipal councils of Aabenraa, Tønder, and Sønderborg. Bund Deutscher Nordschleswiger estimates the current number of North Schleswig Germans to be around 15,000, i.e. around 6% of the North Schleswig population of c. 250,000. This is a far smaller group than the 50,000 Danes who live in Southern Schleswig, where, for instance, Flensborg Avis, a newspaper in Danish, is printed every day.

See also

 Potato Germans
 Danish minority of Southern Schleswig

References

Further reading

Thaler, Peter, ed. Like Snow in the Sun? The German Minority in Denmark in Historical Perspective. Berlin and Boston: De Gruyter, 2022. .

External links
German-Danish agreement on minority rights, 1955

 
Ethnic groups in Denmark
German diaspora in Europe
German minorities